Millionaire Life was a national promotional lottery game that offered a top prize of $1 million a year for 25 years, four prizes of $1 million and 20 prizes of $100,000. It has been run four times across Canada between 2007 and 2011.

Organization
The Millionaire Life promotional lottery game is administered by the Interprovincial Lottery Corporation, an alliance of the five regional (some provincial) lottery corporations that cover all of Canada.

2007 promotion
The winning ticket was purchased by Jagtesh and Gurinder Grewal, both of Winnipeg, Manitoba. They split the lump sum payment of $17 million instead of the annuity of $1 million a year for 25 years because there was more than one person claiming the prize.

2008 promotion
The winning ticket was purchased by a Burnaby, British Columbia woman, Angela Towle. She opted for the lump sum of $17 million.

2009 promotion
The winning ticket was purchased by Faye Lepage of Edmonton, Alberta. She opted for the lump sum of $17 million.

2011 promotion
Millionaire Life ran from March 1 to 31, 2011, with the draw happening the night of March 31.  The winning ticket was purchased in Quebec.

Future
Millionaire Life did not run in 2012. Ending the Millionaire Life lottery being replaced by the Daily Grand.

See also
 Interprovincial Lottery Corporation
 Lotto 6/49
 Lotto Super 7 (replaced by Lotto Max in September 2009)

References

External links
 ALC - Millionaire Life 2009 Winning Numbers and Prize Payout

Lotteries in Canada